John 20:25 is the twenty-fifth verse of the twentieth chapter of the Gospel of John in the New Testament. It contains the reaction of Thomas after the other disciples told him about Jesus' appearance.

Content
The original Koine Greek, according to the Textus Receptus, reads:

In the King James Version of the Bible it is translated as:
The other disciples therefore said unto him, We have seen the Lord. But he said unto them, Except I shall see in his hands the print of the nails, and put my finger into the print of the nails, and thrust my hand into his side, I will not believe.

The modern World English Bible translates the passage as:
The other disciples therefore said to him, "We have seen the Lord!" But he said to them, "Unless I see in his hands the print of the nails, and put my hand into his side, I will not believe."

For a collection of other versions see BibleHub John 20:25

Analysis
The disciples kept telling (Greek imperfect word: elegon, in the sense of "attempted to tell") their vision of Jesus ("We have seen the Lord"), just like what Mary did in John 20:18.

when confronted with the resurrection account. Thomas' emphatic disbelief of the disciples' testimony intensified his resolution to seek physical evidence to convince him that the risen Jesus was the Jesus he had known. 

The palpable marks (Greek: typos) – the 'print of the nails' in Jesus' hands and the pierced hole on his side – provide 'apologetic function' for the readers of the gospel.

References

Sources

External links
Jesus Appears to His Disciples

20:25
John 20:25